Niko Gotsiridze (Nico Gotziridze, Нико Гоциридзе) (16 February, 1871 – 30 July, 1949) was a Georgian actor, director and a comedian who charmed spectators with his sense of humor. For fifteen years he managed the Tbilisi Ossetian Theatre.

Gotsiridze was the son of a tailor, but loved the stage, and first took to the boards at the age of twelve.  He developed a comedy act and played the local working-class establishments until, in 1922, he joined a professional touring troupe under the director Kote Marjanishvili (Марджановым).  He was much lauded and in 1924 he was made a People's Artist of the Georgia SSR.

Awards
 People's artist of the Georgian SSR – 1924
 Order of the Badge of Honour

References

External links

Male stage actors from Georgia (country)
Male comedians
20th-century male actors from Georgia (country)
1871 births
1949 deaths